Bryan J. May  (born September 19, 1974) is a Canadian politician who was elected in the 2015 and 2019 Canadian federal elections to represent the electoral district of Cambridge as a Member of Parliament in the House of Commons of Canada. He is a member of the Liberal Party.

May first stood for the Liberal Party in the 2011 federal election, where he finished third. May was acclaimed as the Liberal Party's candidate in Cambridge for the 2015 federal election in May 2015.

On December 3, 2021, Prime Minister Justin Trudeau announced May's appointment as Parliamentary secretary to the Minister of National Defence, Anita Anand.

42nd Parliament of Canada 
During the 42nd Canadian Parliament May spoke in the House of Commons for the first time on December 11, 2015 to mark the death of a high-profile constituent. He has since spoken several times on various topics. On January 25, 2016, May introduced his first Private Member's Bill, Bill C-240. Bill C-240 is an act to amend the Income Tax Act to introduce a non-refundable tax credit for individuals who take first aid, CPR, and AED training. The bill was opposed by the Liberal government during second reading largely due to stated concerns about its fairness and effectiveness, added tax code complexity, and fiscal responsibility. After being referred to the standing committee on finance it was not proceeded with.

43rd Parliament of Canada 
During the 43rd Canadian Parliament, May served as the chair of the Standing Committee on Veterans Affairs (ACVA), chair of the Subcommittee on Agenda and Procedure of the Standing Committee on Veterans Affairs, and a member of Liaison Committee.

In 2021, May introduced one private member bill, Bill C-272 An Act to Amend the Copyright Act (diagnosis, maintenance or repair) which sought to legalize the circumvention of a digital rights management program if the circumvention is solely for the purpose of diagnosis, maintenance, or repair of a product. The bill was brought to a vote and advanced to committee stage on June 2, 2021 with all party support. However, the bill died in committee when the 43rd Parliament ended in August.

Electoral record

References

External links
 Official Website

1974 births
Living people
Members of the House of Commons of Canada from Ontario
Liberal Party of Canada MPs
People from Guelph
People from Cambridge, Ontario
University of Waterloo alumni
21st-century Canadian politicians